Live Progression is the first live album by Canadian death metal band Neuraxis. It was recorded live at L'Imperial in Quebec City, QC, Canada, on April 7, 2007. It was released on November 6, 2007, by Galy Records and Willowtip Records in North America, and by Earache Records in the UK.

Live Progression was meant to introduce the new line-up to fans, following the departures of founding member and guitarist Steven Henry and long-time vocalist Ian Campbell. It is the first release featuring vocalist Alex Leblanc and guitarist Will Seghers.

Track listing

Personnel

Neuraxis
 Alex Leblanc – vocals
 Robin Miley – guitar
 Will Seghers – guitar
 Yan Theil – bass
 Tommy McKinnon – drums

Additional personnel
 David Gendrom – instrument recording at New Roch Studio
 Jean-Yves Theriault – front of house sound
 J-F Dagenais – mixing at JFD Studio
 Jeff Fortin – mastering at Badass Studio
 Svencho – cover art, layout
 Fred Laroche – photography
 Caroline Traiter – photography
 Yves Gagnon – photography
 Patryk Pigeon – photography

References

Neuraxis (band) albums
Galy Records albums
2007 live albums